The Miccosukee are a Native American tribe of Florida.

Miccosukee can also refer to:

Miccosukee, Florida, a small, now unincorporated, village in Leon County, Florida
Lake Miccosukee in Jefferson County, Florida
Mikasuki language
Miccosukee Land Co-op, an intentional community in North Florida
Miccosukee Resort & Gaming, a casino in Florida